Wutubus annularis is a tubular Ediacaran fossil from China.  It is the only species in the genus Wutubus.Genus name was derived from the fossil locality near the village of Wuhe (Wu River) and from Latin tubus (tube), and  the species epithet derived from Latin, annularis, with reference to the transverse annulae on the tube.

References

Ediacaran life
Ediacaran Asia
Monotypic genera